Hypsopygia planalis is a species of snout moth in the genus Hypsopygia. It was described by Augustus Radcliffe Grote in 1880 and is found in North America, including Colorado.

References

Moths described in 1880
Pyralini